Xavier Maassen (born 22 June 1980 in Heerlen) is a Dutch racing driver who previously competed in the FIA GT1 World Championship for Mad-Croc Racing. Recently, he has participated in the Blancpain Endurance Series for Prospeed Competition. He lives in Lanaken in Belgium.

Career

Single-seaters

Formula Ford
Maassen began his racing career with success in Formula Ford, winning the Belgian championship in 2001 and 2002. He also finished fifth in the Benelux series in 2001, and was runner-up to Jaap van Lagen in 2002. He also finished fifth in the Dutch series in 2002.

Formula Renault

Maassen stepped up to Formula Renault in 2003, finishing seventh in Formula Renault 2.0 Netherlands, before finishing runner-up to Junior Strous in 2004. Having competed in selected Eurocup Formula Renault 2.0 in the previous two seasons, Maassen moved to the series full-time in 2005, finishing tenth overall. In 2006, he combined another season in the Eurocup, where he finished 13th, with a season in the North European Championship, a merger of the Dutch and German national series. He finished third in the overall standings behind Filipe Albuquerque and Chris van der Drift.

Maassen stepped up to the Formula Renault 3.5 Series in 2007, but failed to score any points in 17 starts for Prema Powerteam.

GT racing
Maassen began racing in the FIA GT Championship in 2008 driving a Corvette C6.R for the Selleslagh Racing Team alongside Christophe Bouchut. He won just his second GT race at Monza, and the pair finished 13th in the driver's standings.

Maassen started the 2009 season driving a Corvette for Luc Alphand Aventures, but the team missed the races at Spa and Algarve, and so raced for another Corvette team, Sangari Team Brazil at those races. Maassen also raced for Luc Alphand Aventures at the 2009 24 Hours of Le Mans, finishing second in the GT1 category.

Maassen competed in the new FIA GT1 World Championship in 2010, returning to the DKR Engineering team, now under the Mad-Croc Racing banner.

Racing record

Complete Formula Renault 3.5 Series results
(key) (Races in bold indicate pole position) (Races in italics indicate fastest lap)

Complete GT1 World Championship results

24 Hours of Le Mans results

References

External links
 Official website

Living people
1980 births
Sportspeople from Heerlen
Dutch racing drivers
Formula Ford drivers
Formula Renault Eurocup drivers
Formula Renault 2.0 NEC drivers
FIA GT Championship drivers
24 Hours of Le Mans drivers
World Series Formula V8 3.5 drivers
FIA GT1 World Championship drivers
Blancpain Endurance Series drivers
24 Hours of Spa drivers
ADAC GT Masters drivers
Prema Powerteam drivers
Dutch Formula Renault 2.0 drivers
JD Motorsport drivers
W Racing Team drivers
Nürburgring 24 Hours drivers
24H Series drivers